Puno (Aymara and ) is a city in southeastern Peru, located on the shore of Lake Titicaca.  It is the capital city of the Puno Region and the Puno Province with a population of approximately 140,839 (2015 estimate). The city was established in 1668 by viceroy Pedro Antonio Fernández de Castro as capital of the province of Paucarcolla with the name San Juan Bautista de Puno. The name was later changed to San Carlos de Puno, in honor of king Charles II of Spain. Puno has several churches dating back from the colonial period; they were built to service the Spanish population and evangelize the natives.

Overview 

Puno is an important agricultural and livestock region; important livestock are llamas and alpacas, which graze on its immense plateaus and plains. Much of the city economy relies on the black market, fueled by cheap goods smuggled in from Bolivia. Puno is served by the Inca Manco Capac International Airport in nearby Juliaca.

Puno is situated between the shores of Lake Titicaca and the mountains surrounding the city. There is less than two miles of flat land between the shores and the foothills, which has caused the growing city to continue to expand upwards onto the hillsides. As a result, the town's less developed and poorest areas, which are high on the hillsides, often have very steep streets, which are generally unpaved and cannot be accessed by automobile.

Up one of these streets is the Kuntur Wasi viewpoint, which has a large metal sculpture of a condor. There are some 700 steps to climb to reach the sculpture, but the view across the city and Lake Titicaca beyond is breathtaking.

During the celebrations of the Feast of the "Virgen de la Candelaria" and the Regional Competition of Autochthonous Dances. Puno's access to Lake Titicaca is surrounded by 41 floating islands. To this day, the Uros people maintain and live on these man-made islands, depending on the lake for their survival, and are a large tourist destination. Dragon Boat racing, an old tradition in Puno, is a very popular activity amongst tourists.

Puno is the first major hub in the constant migration of indigenous peoples of the Andes to the larger cities of Peru. It is the largest city in the Southern Altiplano and is the recipient of new residents from surrounding smaller agricultural communities of people seeking better opportunities for education and employment. As such, Puno is served by several small Institutes of Technology, Education and other technical or junior college-type facilities. Additionally it is home to what is commonly referred to as the "UNAP" or the Universidad Nacional del Altiplano de Puno, which was founded in 1856.

Geography

Climate
Puno features an alpine climate (ETH, according to the Köppen climate classification).

As Puno is located at such a high elevation, it experiences more extreme weather conditions than would be expected for its tropical latitude. During the winter months from June to August, night-time temperatures usually drop well below . At this high altitude, the rays of the sun are very strong. Most of the annual precipitation falls during the southern hemisphere summer, with the winter months being very dry.

Folklore 

Music and dance are typical parts of the Puno folklore. The most important dances are the Wifala de Asillo, the Ichu Carnival, the Tuntuna, the Khashua de Capachica, the Machu-tusuj, the Kcajelo, and the Pandilla Puneña.

Gallery

See also 
 Lake Titicaca rail ferry
 PeruRail
 Esteves (island)

References

External links 

 
 Puno on DiscoverPeru
 Travel Information about Puno

 
Populated places in the Puno Region
Cities in Peru
Populated places on Lake Titicaca
Populated lakeshore places in Peru
Regional capital cities in Peru
Populated places in the Altiplano